Juan José Ubaldo Cabrera (born April 30, 1979 in Santo Domingo, Distrito Nacional) is a boxer from the Dominican Republic best known to win the PanAm title at middleweight as an amateur.

Amateur
At the Sydney Olympics 2000 he lost in the first round to local hero Richard Rowles.

Ubaldo won Light Middleweight silver at the 2002 Central American Games losing to Juan Camilo Novoa.

He added the gold medal at middleweight 2003, at the Pan American Games in Santo Domingo.
He defeated Jean Pascal 19:11 and Yordanis Despaigne 23:12.

He participated in the 2004 Summer Olympics for his native Caribbean country. There he was stopped in the first round of the Middleweight (75 kg) division by Cameroon's Hassan Ndam Njikam.

Pro
He turned pro in 2005 and beat his first 11 opponents.

References
 
 
 

1979 births
Living people
Middleweight boxers
Boxers at the 2000 Summer Olympics
Boxers at the 2003 Pan American Games
Boxers at the 2004 Summer Olympics
Olympic boxers of the Dominican Republic
Dominican Republic male boxers
Pan American Games gold medalists for the Dominican Republic
Pan American Games medalists in boxing
Central American and Caribbean Games silver medalists for the Dominican Republic
Competitors at the 2002 Central American and Caribbean Games
Central American and Caribbean Games medalists in boxing
Medalists at the 2003 Pan American Games